Tomáš Matonoha (born 13 March 1971, in Brno) is a Czech actor.

Biography 
He studied at JAMU (Janáček Academy of Music and Performing Arts). In 1994 he became a member of the ensemble of the HaTheatre in Brno. In 2005 he began performing at the Prague's theatre Rokoko.

Filmography 
Prázdniny 3 (2019)  - (Laco Lehotský)
Prázdniny 2 (2018) - (Laco Lehotský)
Prázdniny (2017)  - (Laco Lehotský)
Polski Film (2012) 
Ulovit miliardáře (2009)
Comeback (2008) TV series (Tomáš Pacovský)
Stand Up Comedy (2008) TV series (various characters)
Gympl (2008)
Bobule (2007) 
Láska In Memoriam (2007) (TV) 
Bestiář  (2006) 
Dámský Gambit (2007) (TV) 
Hrubeš a Mareš jsou kamarádi do deště (2006)
Happy Birthday (2006)
Doblba (2005) 
The Masters (2004)
Muž, kterého chtějí (2004) (TV) 
Komediograf (2003) (TV) 
Vyhnáni z ráje (2003)
Wild Bees (2003) 
Zpráva o putování studentů Petra a Jakuba (2000)
Byl jednou jeden polda 2 (1996) 
Byl jednou jeden polda (1995)

Theatre

Personal life 
With actress Lucie Benešová has a son Štěpán Matonoha. Together cradled Lucie's son Lucian Blažek and adopted a daughter Sára.

References

External links 
 
 Biography on csfd.cz

1971 births
Living people
Czech male film actors
Czech male stage actors
Czech male television actors
Actors from Brno
Janáček Academy of Music and Performing Arts alumni
20th-century Czech male actors
21st-century Czech male actors